

Events
 On 23 June 2009, South China Brazilian striker Cacá announced the decision of not renew the contract as he needs to return to his pregnant wife in Brazil after winning 4-0 against Singapore team Home United in the Round of 16 at AFC Cup 2009 knockout stage.
 On 29 June 2009, Happy Valley agrees the transfer of Hong Kong national trio Gerard, Leung Chun Pong and Chao Pengfei to South China.
 On 2 July, South China announced Brazilian defender Sidraílson will not renew contract as he got attention from clubs in Middle East.
 On 6 July, South China manager Steven Lo announced on 6 July 2009 that União de Leiria Brazilian defender Luiz Carlos has joined South China AA for the 2009/10 Hong Kong First Division League and AFC Cup 2009 season.

Current squad
As of 28 August 2009.

Transfers

In

Out

Pre-season friendlies & Warm-up Matches

2009/10 Hong Kong Community Shield

2009/10 HKFA bma First Division League

2009/10 HKFA Canbo Senior Shield

AFC Cup

AFC Cup 2009

Squad statistics
Statistics accurate as of match played on 21 October 2009

References

2009-10
Hong Kong football clubs 2009–10 season